Hittarp is a locality situated in Helsingborg Municipality, Skåne County, Sweden with 4,075 inhabitants in 2010.

References 

Populated places in Helsingborg Municipality
Populated places in Skåne County
Populated coastal places in Sweden